Pseudopus is a genus of anguid lizards that are native to Eurasia. One extant species remains, the sheltopusik, with four fossil species. They are the most robust members of subfamily Anguinae. The oldest fossils of the group date to the Early Miocene, but there are possible Oligocene records.

Classification
Genus Pseudopus
Pseudopus apodus  – sheltopusik, Pallas's glass lizard, European legless lizard, European glass lizard
†Pseudopus ahnikoviensis
†Pseudopus laurillardi
†Pseudopus pannonicus
†Pseudopus rugosus

References

Anguids
Lizards of Asia
Lizards of Europe
Lizard genera
Reptile genera with one living species
Taxa named by Blasius Merrem